Carlo Gamna (1866–1950) was an Italian physician remembered for Gandy-Gamna nodules and Gamna-Favre bodies.

External links 

20th-century Italian physicians
1866 births
1950 deaths